Manlio De Domenico is an Italian physicist and complex systems scientist, currently Professor of Physics at the University of Padua and previously at the Fondazione Bruno Kessler in Trento (Italy). In 2014 he has co-founded the Mediterranean School of Complex Networks, and in 2019 he has contributed to found the Italian Chapter of the Complex Systems Society.

The focus of his research is on complex adaptive systems and big data analysis, where he is best known for his theoretical and computational work in network science, statistical physics and nonlinear dynamics of multilayer systems.

Early life and education

He was born in Messina in 1984. He got his Ph.D in Nuclear and Astroparticle physics from the University of Catania and the Scuola Superiore di Catania in 2012, proposing a data-driven model for the propagation of Ultra-High Energy Cosmic Rays (UHECR) in a magnetized Universe and a multiscale approach to analyze their anisotropic distribution at Earth, with visiting scholarships at the Institute for Nuclear Theory of the University of Washington and the Institut de physique nucléaire d'Orsay.

Career and research

He held postdoctoral positions (2012-2013) at the School of Computer Science of the University of Birmingham (UK), and (2013-2016) at the University of Rovira i Virgili (Spain). In 2016 he has been a visiting scholar at the Max Planck Institute for the Physics of Complex Systems. From 2016 to 2018 he hold the “Juan de la Cierva” senior fellowship at the University of Rovira i Virgili. Since 2018 he directs the Complex Multilayer Networks (CoMuNe) Lab founded at the Fondazione Bruno Kessler.

He has published more than 130 scientific papers, with interdisciplinary contributions in computational social science, network epidemiology, network neuroscience, network medicine and systems biology. Notable works include the tensorial formulation of multilayer structure and dynamics, applications to community structure and coupling of human behavior with epidemic spreading, network geometry,  network entropy, percolation and network robustness to perturbations, Infodemic.

His collaborators include Alex Arenas, Sylvie Briand, James Cronin, Shlomo Havlin, Vito Latora, Yamir Moreno, Mason Porter and Alan Andrew Watson.

Awards and honours

 2020:  Young Scientist Award for Socio- and Econophysics, from the German Physical Society for Multilayer modeling and analysis of complex socio-economic systems 
 2019: IUPAP Young Scientist Award on Statistical Physics, from the International Union of Pure and Applied Physics C3 commission, for Interdisciplinary Applications of Statistical Physics
 2017: USERN Prize in Formal Sciences, from USERN, for modeling the complexity of systems of systems
 2016: Junior Scientific Award, from the Complex Systems Society, for a number of pioneering contributions to the field of multilayer networks
 2012: Bruno Rossi Prize, from the Istituto Nazionale di Fisica Nucleare (INFN) for the Best Italian PhD thesis in Nuclear and Astroparticle Physics

References

External links

1984 births
Living people
Italian physicists
University of Catania alumni